This article lists the countries of the Arab League sorted by their gross domestic product (GDP) at nominal values. GDP is the value of all final goods and services produced within a nation in a given year. The table below shows the nominal GDP and GDP per capita for the 22 Arab League members in 2022. The figures shown are estimates compiled by the International Monetary Fund's World Economic Outlook

List

See also 
List of Arab League countries by GDP (PPP)
Economy of the Arab League

Notes

References

Arab League
Countries by GDP
GDP (nominal)